Chevalier is both a French surname and a title. Notable people with the name include:

Surname:
 Albert Chevalier (1861–1923), English comedian and actor
 Anaïs Chevalier (born 1993), a French biathlete.
 Anne Chevalier, French Polynesian actress and dancer
 Auguste Chevalier (1873–1956), French botanist
 Antoine Gombaud, Chevalier de Méré (1607–1684), French writer
 Caroline Chevalier (died 1917), British writer and traveller
 Godfrey Chevalier, (1889–1922), American naval aviator
 Grahame Chevalier (1937–2017), South African cricketer
 Haakon Chevalier (1901–1985), author
 Jay Chevalier (born 1936), American singer
 Judith Chevalier, American economist
 Jules Chevalier (1824–1907), French Roman Catholic priest
 Marcel Chevalier (1921–2008), French executioner
 Maurice Chevalier (1888–1972), Belgian-French actor, singer, and popular entertainer
 Michael Chevalier (born 1933), German lip-sync speaker and actor
 Michel Chevalier (1806–1879), French engineer and economist
 Mike Chevalier (1943–2006), American cinematographer
 Morgan Chevalier, fictional character
 Nicholas Chevalier (1828–1902), Australian artist
 Nicole Chevalier, American soprano
 Papa Joe Chevalier (1948-2011), American sports talk radio host
 Pierre Chevalier (caver) (1905–2001), French caver and mountaineer
 Sivaji Ganesan Chevalier (1927–2001), Indian actor and politician
 Tracy Chevalier (born 1962), historical novelist
 Ulysse Chevalier (1841–1923), French bibliographer and historian
 Yannick Chevalier (born 1987), Saint Martin footballer

Title:
 Chevalier d'Éon (1728–1810), French soldier, spy and androgyne
 Chevalier de Johnstone (1719–c. 1791), Scottish soldier in French North America
 Chevalier de Mailly (d. 1724), French author
 Chevalier de Saint-Georges (1745–1799), Afro-French classical composer, one of the first known composers of African descent in the Western European classical tradition

French-language surnames
Occupational surnames
Surnames from status names